The coat of arms of the Spanish autonomous community of Castile and León depicts the traditional arms of Castile (the yellow castle) quartered with the arms of León (the purple lion). It is topped with a royal crown.

The lion design is attributed to Alfonso VII, who became king of Castile and León in 1126. The castle symbol is attributed to his grandson Alfonso VIII, In 1230, Ferdinand III united the two kingdoms and quartered the arms as a symbol of the union. Until the sixteenth century, a full castle, with walls and three towers, rather than the current town design, was used.

Its original elements are used not only in the current autonomous community of Castilla y León, but also in the national coat of arms of Spain, in municipal arms like the coat of arms of Toledo and in coats of arms of many former territories which belonged to the Crown of Castile, such as Jaén or Los Angeles, California.

AIt also appears on the Catholic diocese coat of arms of Diocese of St. Petersburg, the Archdiocese of Santa Fe, Diocese of St. Petersburg and the Roman Catholic Archdiocese of Manila.

In history

Castile and León autonomous community

In the world

See also
 Flag of Castile and León
 Heraldry of Castile
 Heraldry of León

References

 
Castile and Leon
Castile and Leon
Castile and Leon